Bullets is an Indian action thriller web series which is directed by Devang Dholakia. The series features Sunny Leone, Karishma Tanna, Vivek Vaswani, Amaan F Khan. The series released on 8 January 2021.

Cast
Sunny Leone
Karishma Tanna
Vivek Vaswani
Deepak Tijori

Release
The official trailer of the web series was launched on 2 January 2021 by MX Player on YouTube.

References

External links

2021 web series debuts
Hindi-language web series
Indian web series
MX Player original programming